Bakur I (Latinized as Bacurius), of the Arsacid dynasty, was a king of Iberia (natively known as Kartli; ancient Georgia) from 234 to 249.

The name  is the Latin form of the Greek Bakour, itself a variant of the Middle Iranian Pakur, derived from Old Iranian bag-puhr ('son of a god'). The name "Bakur" is the Georgian (ბაკურ) and Armenian (Բակուր) attestation of Middle Iranian Pakur.

He is known exclusively from the medieval Georgian chronicles which make him either 21st or 23rd in the royal list of Iberia and merely relates that Bakur was the son of Vach'e.

References

3rd-century monarchs in Asia
Arsacid dynasty of Iberia